Reginald C. Lindsay (March 19, 1945 – March 12, 2009) was a United States district judge of the United States District Court for the District of Massachusetts.

Education and career

Born in Birmingham, Alabama, Lindsay received a Bachelor of Arts degree from Morehouse College in 1967 and a Juris Doctor from Harvard Law School in 1970. He was in private practice in Boston, Massachusetts from 1970 to 1975. He was the Massachusetts state commissioner of public utilities from 1975 to 1977, thereafter returning to his private practice until 1993.

Federal judicial service

On October 27, 1993, Lindsay was nominated by President Bill Clinton to a seat on the United States District Court for the District of Massachusetts vacated by David Sutherland Nelson. Lindsay was confirmed by the United States Senate on November 20, 1993, and received his commission on November 24, 1993. Judge Lindsay took a leave of absence from the bench in April 2008 while recovering from illness and died in Boston on March 12, 2009. He was 63 years old.

See also 
 List of African-American federal judges
 List of African-American jurists

References

External links

1945 births
2009 deaths
Morehouse College alumni
Harvard Law School alumni
Judges of the United States District Court for the District of Massachusetts
United States district court judges appointed by Bill Clinton
African-American judges
Lawyers from Birmingham, Alabama
20th-century American judges
21st-century American judges